Alan Nolan (born 4 June 1985) is a hurler for Dublin and St Brigid's. He was named on the Dublin Blue Stars team for 2006.

Career statistics

Honours
Dublin
Leinster Senior Hurling Championship: 2013
National Hurling League Division 1: 2011
National Hurling League Division 1B: 2013
National Hurling League Division 2: 2006
Walsh Cup: 2011, 2013

References

1985 births
Living people
Dublin inter-county hurlers
Hurling goalkeepers
Irish plumbers
St Brigid's (Dublin) hurlers
People educated at St. Declan's College, Dublin